The J.C. Bloem-poëzieprijs (Dutch for J.C. Bloem Poetry Prize) is a biennial Dutch literary award. The award is named after Dutch poet and essayist J. C. Bloem and is awarded to a Dutch or Flemisch poet's second collection of poems. The award was created in 2001 and first awarded in 2003.

Saskia Stuiveling was head of the jury of the J.C. Bloem-poëzieprijs until her death in 2017. As of 2018 Roger van Boxtel is head of the jury.

Winners 

 2003 - Paul Marijnis, Roze zoenen
 2005 - Hagar Peeters, Koffers zeelucht
 2007 - Hanz Mirck, Wegsleepregeling van kracht
 2009 - Maria Barnas, Er staat een stad op
 2011 - Ester Naomi Perquin, Namens de ander
 2013 - Mischa Andriessen, Huisverraad
 2015 - Els Moors, Liederen van een kapseizend paard
 2017 - Maarten van der Graaff, Dood Werk
 2019 - Jonathan Griffioen, Gedichten met een Mazda 626
 2021 - Moya de Feyter, Massastrandingen

References

External links 
 Official website (in Dutch)

Dutch poetry awards
2001 establishments in the Netherlands
Awards established in 2001